The Master of the Robes is an office in the British Royal Household. He is responsible for the King's robes at times such as a coronation, the annual Order of the Garter service and the State Opening of Parliament. Since the reign of King Edward VII, the office has only been filled for coronations (note, the office is not allocated during the reign of a queen regnant). Below is a list of known office holders:

Henry VII 
 1496: Sir Edward Burton

James I 
 1603-1612: Roger Aston.
 1617–1625: Christopher Villiers

Charles, Prince of Wales, later Charles I 
 1611–1622: Hon. Robert Carey
 1622–1628: Spencer Compton, Lord Compton
 1628–1649: ?

Charles II 
 1660–1662: Henry Cavendish, Viscount Mansfield
 1662–1678: Hon. Lawrence Hyde
 1678-1679: Sidney Godolphin
 1679–1685: Henry Sydney

James II 
 1685–1687: Arthur Herbert
 1687–1688: Lord Thomas Howard

William III 
 1690–1695: William Nassau de Zuylestein
 1695–1701: Arnold van Keppel
 1701: Cornelius Nassau

Queen Anne

George I 
 1714–1726: William Cadogan
 1727: George Cholmondeley, Viscount Malpas

George II 
 1727–1757: Augustus Schutz
 1757–1760: Edward Finch

George III 
 1760–1791: Hon. James Brudenell
 1791–1808: Sir James Peachey
 1808–1809: Hon. William Harcourt
 1809–1812: Hon. Henry Sedley
 1812–1820: Charles Nassau Thomas

George IV 
 1820–1830: Lord Francis Conyngham

William IV 
 1830: Sir Charles Pole, Bt.
 1830–1837: Sir George Seymour

Victoria

Edward VII 
 1902: Charles Harbord, 5th Baron Suffield

George V 
 1911: Victor Spencer, 1st Viscount Churchill

Edward VIII 
 1936: Edward Colebrooke, 1st Baron Colebrooke

George VI
1936: Post vacant

Charles III 
2022: Post vacant

References

External links 
 Database of Court Officers
 Burke's Peerage & Gentry

Positions within the British Royal Household